Mayce Galoni is a Canadian stand-up comedian, whose comedy album Awkwarder received a Juno Award nomination for Comedy Album of the Year at the Juno Awards of 2019.

Originally from the community of Binbrook in Hamilton, Ontario, he is currently based primarily in Vancouver, British Columbia. He was a finalist in SiriusXM Canada's Top Comic competition in 2016, and competed again in 2017. He received three Vancouver Comedy Award nominations in 2019, for Best Comedy Album, Best Clean Joke and Breakout Artist.

He is in a relationship with comedian Sophie Buddle, with whom he cohosts the podcast Obsessed.

References

External links

21st-century Canadian comedians
Canadian stand-up comedians
Canadian male comedians
Comedians from Ontario
People from Hamilton, Ontario
Living people
Year of birth missing (living people)
Comedians from Vancouver